Thamnomanes is a genus of insectivorous birds in the antbird family, Thamnophilidae. They are restricted to the Neotropics and are important components of forest mixed-species feeding flocks.

The genus Thamnomanes was introduced by the German ornithologist Jean Cabanis in 1847. The name combines the Ancient Greek words thamnos "bush" and -manēs "fond of". The type species was subsequently designated as the cinereous antshrike.

This genus contains the following species:
 Dusky-throated antshrike, Thamnomanes ardesiacus
 Cinereous antshrike, Thamnomanes caesius
 Saturnine antshrike, Thamnomanes saturninus
 Bluish-slate antshrike, Thamnomanes schistogynus

References

 
Bird genera
 
Taxonomy articles created by Polbot